Piráti Chomutov is a Czech ice hockey team from Chomutov, Czech Republic.  Established as ČSK Chomutov in 1945, the team has played in Chomutov through numerous team name changes and elevations/relegations in the Czechoslovak and Czech hockey leagues. They currently playing in the third level 2nd Czech Republic Hockey League. Their home arena is the Rocknet aréna located in Chomutov, Czech Republic.

History
The club was established in 1945 as ČSK Chomutov.

In the 1950/1951 season, playing as Sokol Hutě, the team was promoted to the Czechoslovak First Ice Hockey League, where they played until the 1963/1964 season.

In 1967, as VTŽ Chomutov, the team was promoted to the highest league again but was relegated the very next year. In 1984 the club was demoted to the third level of hockey in Czechoslovak hockey, the Second National Hockey League.

In 1997, as KLH Chomutov, the club bought the license in the First National Hockey League (FNHL) from HC Slovan Ústečtí Lvi.

After winning the league in the 2011–12 FNHL season, Piráti Chomutov returned to the top-level league Czech Extraliga. During the play-outs in the 2013-14 season Piráti Chomutov lost and returned to the First National Hockey League. Season 2014/2015 in FNHL was one of the most successful in history. Pirati Chomutov became a winner and after play off returned to the top-level league (season 2015/2016).

1956 airplane disaster
On 24 November 1956, while the team was operating under the name TJ Baník Chomutov ZJF, some members of the team were involved in a fatal airplane accident. A Czechoslovak Airlines flight, on an Ilyushin Il-12B aircraft, crashed near Eglisau, Switzerland.  Three players, two top club officials and a reporter were among others on board the scheduled flight from Zurich to Prague, which crashed in fields after an engine failure. All on board perished.

Roster 
Updated April 25, 2018

|}

Club names 
 1945 - ČSK Chomutov
 1949 - ZJS spojené ocelárny
 1951 - Sokol Hutě
 1953 - TJ Baník Chomutov ZJF
 1958 - Baník VTŽ Chomutov
 1960 - VTŽ Chomutov
 1991 - Klub ledního hokeje VT VTJ Chomutov
 1996 - KLH Chomutov
 2011 - Piráti Chomutov

See also
 List of accidents involving sports teams

References

External links
  Official website

Chomutov 
Sport in Chomutov
1945 establishments in Czechoslovakia
Ice hockey clubs established in 1945
Chomutov